Coleophora balkara is a moth of the family Coleophoridae. It is found in Russia (northern Caucasus).

References

balkara
Moths described in 1997
Moths of Europe